Charley's Nieces is a 1974 West German comedy film directed by Walter Boos and starring Josef Moosholzer, Bertram Edelmann and Massimo E. Melis. The film's title is a reference to Brandon Thomas's farce Charley's Aunt. It is also known by the alternative title of Confessions of a Sexy Photographer.

Three men disguise themselves as women in order to get jobs in a photographer's studio.

Cast
 Josef Moosholzer as Max
 Bertram Edelmann as Stefan
 Massimo E. Melis as Luigi
 Karel Otto as Charly Braun
 Elke Boltenhagen as Gerlinde
 Eva Gross as Resi
 Patrizia Viotti as Claude
 Orchidea de Santis as Dominique
 Jean-Marie Dany as Li
 Florian Endlicher as Jackyboy
 Elisabeth Volkmann as Berta Schwarzkopf
 Günther Kieslich as Albert Schwarzkopf
 Nico Wolferstetter as Kurt Hellwig
 Josef Fröhlich as Johann
 Edgar Wenzel as Konrad
 Marie Luise Lusewitz as Anna
 Rosl Mayr as Frau Boesig
 Ulrich Beiger as Dr. Stingl
 Susanne Baer as Bernhardina
 Hartmut Neugebauer as Knall
 Anneliese Groebl as Dicke
 Willy Schultes as Gerichtsvollzieher
 Felicitas Peters as Kundin von Stefan
 Doris Delaas as Kundin
 Elke Deuringer as Kundin
 Heinz Kopitz as Johannas Freund
 Ursula Reit as Krankenschwester

References

Bibliography 
 Leslie Y. Rabkin. The Celluloid Couch: An Annotated International Filmography of the Mental Health Professional in the Movies and Television, from the Beginning to 1990. Scarecrow Press, 1998.

External links 
 

1974 films
1970s sex comedy films
West German films
German sex comedy films
1970s German-language films
Films directed by Walter Boos
Constantin Film films
1974 comedy films
1970s German films